The football tournament at the 1935 Central American and Caribbean Games was held in San Salvador from 24 March to 3 April.

The gold medal was won by Mexico who earned 10 points.

Squads

Table 

A 2 point system used.

Results

Statistics

Goalscorers

References

External links 

Results
Match Details

1935 Central American and Caribbean Games
1935